Ofer Lahav  is Perren Chair of Astronomy at University College London (UCL), Vice-Dean (International) of the UCL Faculty of Mathematical and Physical Sciences (MAPS) and Co-Director of the STFC Centre for Doctoral Training in Data Intensive Science.
His research area is Observational Cosmology, in particular probing Dark Matter and Dark Energy. His work involves Machine Learning for Big Data. 

Lahav served as the UCL Head of Astrophysics (2004–2011), Vice-Dean (Research) of UCL's Faculty of Mathematical and Physical Sciences (2011–2015), and as Vice-President of the Royal Astronomical Society (2010–2012). He is one of the founders of the Dark Energy Survey (DES), and he co-chaired the international DES Science Committee from inception until 2016. He chairs both the DES:UK and DESI:UK consortia, as well as the DES Advisory Board. He previously served as a member of the STFC Science Board (2016–2019). From 2012 to 2018, Lahav held a European Research Council (ERC) Advanced Grant on "Testing the Dark Energy Paradigm" (TESTDE programme).

Education
Lahav studied Physics at Tel-Aviv University (BSc, 1980), Physics at Ben-Gurion University (MSc, 1985) and earned his Ph.D. (1988) in Astronomy from the University of Cambridge, where he was later a Member of Staff at the Institute of Astronomy (1990–2003) and a Fellow of St Catharine's College, Cambridge.

Research
Lahav's research is focused on cosmological probes of Dark Matter and Dark Energy,
in particular large galaxy surveys.
Lahav has co-authored over 400 research articles in peer reviewed scientific journals, including 10 invited review articles and book chapters. Lahav is a Thomson ISI highly cited author, h-factor 83. His past doctoral students include Chris Lintott.

References

1959 births
Living people
20th-century British astronomers
20th-century British physicists
20th-century British chemists

21st-century British astronomers
21st-century British physicists
21st-century British chemists

British cosmologists
Israeli astronomers
Israeli astrophysicists
Astrochemists
Academics of the University of Cambridge
Academics of University College London
Fellows of the Institute of Physics
Fellows of the Royal Astronomical Society
Tel Aviv University alumni
People from Tiberias
Ben-Gurion University of the Negev alumni